Terri Brosius (née Barous) is an American musician, voice actress, and game designer, best known in gaming circles as the voice of SHODAN in the System Shock series.

Biography
Terri was a member of the Boston band Tribe as a keyboardist and occasional vocalist. On Tribe's albums Here at the Home and Abort, she sang the song "Rescue Me". On Tribe's album Sleeper, she sang the song "Mr. Lieber". Following the band's separation in 1994, she and Tribe guitarist Eric Brosius married. Terri is currently a keyboardist and backup vocalist for the Boston-based band The Vivs.

Brosius and her husband, along with Tribe bass player Greg LoPiccolo, joined video game developer Looking Glass Studios, where they worked on various game projects until its closure in 2000. She and her husband continue to work on various projects with Harmonix.

Brosius performed the voice of the character SHODAN in the CD enhanced version of System Shock, and also in the Irrational Games co-developed sequel, System Shock 2, in addition to several other characters. Brosius voiced the character Viktoria in Thief: The Dark Project and Thief II: The Metal Age, and did some level and cutscene design for Thief: Gold and Thief II, and co-wrote Thief: Deadly Shadows''' story with Randy Smith. She also voiced Ava Johnson in Deus Ex: Invisible War. She is set to reprise her role as SHODAN in System Shock 3. Brosius was announced to be voicing a character in the upcoming game Gloomwood in a trailer for the 2022 PC Gaming Show.

Voice acting rolesSystem Shock – CD enhanced version (1994) (also writer)Terra Nova: Strike Force Centauri (1996)Thief: The Dark Project (1998) (also writer)Thief: Gold (1999) (also writer, level designer)System Shock 2 (1999)Thief II: The Metal Age (2000) (also writer, level designer)Deus Ex: Invisible War (2003)Thief: Deadly Shadows (2004) (also writer)Dishonored (2012) (also writer)Interstellar Marines (2013)Spider: Rite of the Shrouded Moon (2015) (also writer)Dishonored 2 (2016) (also writer)System Shock – Remake (2022)Gloomwood (2022)System Shock 3'' (TBA)

References

External links
 
 
 
 Tribe Interview
 Twitter Announcement

20th-century births
Year of birth missing (living people)
Living people
American voice actresses
Place of birth missing (living people)
American video game actresses
American women rock singers
Tribe (band) members
21st-century American women